Joseph Edward Levine (September 9, 1905 – July 31, 1987) was an American film distributor, financier, and producer. At the time of his death, it was said he was involved in one or another capacity with 497 films. Levine was responsible for the U.S. releases of Godzilla, King of the Monsters!, Attila and Hercules, which helped revolutionize U.S. film marketing, and was founder and president of Embassy Pictures (later Avco-Embassy).  Other films he produced included Two Women, Contempt, The 10th Victim, Marriage Italian Style, The Lion in Winter, The Producers, The Graduate, The Night Porter, A Bridge Too Far, and Carnal Knowledge.

Biography

Early life 
Levine was born in a slum in Boston, Massachusetts, on September 9, 1905. The youngest of six children of a Russian-Jewish immigrant tailor, Joe did whatever work he could to help support his mother, a widow who had remarried only to have her second husband abandon her. This led Joe (in his later years) to tell an interviewer that he had known (in his words) "not one happy day" growing up. At 14 years of age he was hired for full-time work in a dress factory and left school, never to re-enroll.

In the 1920s, in partnership with two of his older brothers, Joe opened a basement dress shop, whose stock the Levine brothers obtained on consignment. He had multiple other jobs and operated the Cafe Wonderbar in Boston's Back Bay during this period and during the early and mid-1930s.

Marriage and distribution career 
In 1937, Levine encountered Rosalie Harrison, then a singer with Rudy Vallee's band, and left the restaurant business for her; within a week of their engagement, at Harrison's insistence, Levine sold the Cafe Wonderbar. They married the following year and moved to New Haven, Connecticut, where Joe bought, and commenced to run, a movie theater. Eventually, he became a successful, if small-time, distributor and exhibitor throughout New England, buying "decrepit" Westerns at low rates for his theaters, which eventually totalled seven, including three drive-ins.

One of Levine's most unusual successes was Body Beautiful, a sex-hygiene film which he saw drawing a line of prospective ticket-buyers who were braving a snowstorm to that end. He later remembered buying it to show in his theaters because "it made me sick." He was also a representative for Burstyn-Mayer distributing Italian films such as Roberto Rossellini's Rome, Open City (1945) and Paisà (1946), and Vittorio De Sica's Bicycle Thieves (1948).

The Second World War led Levine to run an almost jingoistic promotion of the film Ravaged Earth, which had been shot in China. Renting the Shubert Theater in his native Boston, he spent large sums of his own money on advertisements for the film that he wrote himself; these reflected the anti-Japanese sentiments of the times and used language that would later be considered offensive. Nan Robertson's obituary of Levine quotes one of the slogans as reading: "Jap Rats Stop at Nothing – See This. It Will Make You Fighting Mad."

During the 1950s, he became an area sub-distributor for newly-formed American International Pictures. In 1956, he bought the Australian film Walk Into Paradise, its low box-office revenues led him to change the title to Walk Into Hell, which gave it box-office success. Levine discovered that double features with the same cast members or similar titles brought in higher box-office revenues; this led him to present two films together because they had similar titles.

In the 1960s he built two cinemas on 57th Street in New York City – the Lincoln Art Theatre and the Festival Theatre.

Producing career

Embassy Pictures is born 
He entered film production in 1945, co-producing with Maxwell Finn a documentary Gaslight Follies, a compilation of silent film clips narrated by Ben Grauer, which was released through his own company, Embassy Pictures.  He found success in 1956 bringing the Japanese film Godzilla to the American general public, acquiring the rights for $12,000 and spending $400,000 promoting it under the title Godzilla, King of the Monsters!, and earning $1 million in theatrical rentals. He then made a $100,000 deal to bring the 1954 French-Italian film Attila to the US in 1958 and spent $600,000 promoting it, which returned $2 million in rentals. His breakthrough came the following year with Hercules, starring Steve Reeves and released by Warner Bros. Levine invested $120,000 on dubbing, sound effects and new titles and spent $1.25 million on promoting the film. It was one of the highest-grossing films of the year, with rentals of $4.7 million.

The promotion of Sophia Loren 
Levine's Embassy Pictures began dealing in art films, often European ones, in the 1960s. During that decade, he reached the peak of his career and his prestige, which he was able to sustain into the 1970s.

In 1961, Levine bought North American distribution rights for Two Women after seeing no more than three minutes of its "rushes." He was not credited as the "executive producer" of Two Women, which was based on a novella written by Alberto Moravia, had been directed by Vittorio de Sica, and starred Sophia Loren and Eleanora Brown, who acted out the respective roles of a mother and her young daughter whom World War II had displaced from their home. One segment of it showed Moroccan soldiers raping the mother and the daughter.

Levine's promotional campaign focused on one still photograph, which showed Loren, as the mother, wearing a torn dress, kneeling in the dirt, and weeping with rage and grief. Predicting that she would win the Academy Award for her performance, Levine brought Loren to the United States for interviews, bought space for, and placed, large advertisements in newspapers, and saw to it that Two Women appeared in the cities of residence of Academy Award jury members.

Levine's efforts paid off when Loren became the first cast member of a foreign-language film to win the Academy Award for Best Actress. It came to be said of him that he "nursed" Two Women towards its ultimate popularity and success.

Later deals and sale of Embassy 
In 1963, Levine was offered a $30 million deal with Paramount Pictures (making him a major shareholder) to produce films in the vein of his previous successes. Paramount would finance the films and Embassy would receive part of its profits. Following the deal, Levine paid Harold Robbins $900,000 for the rights to three books which were filmed – The Carpetbaggers (1964), Where Love Has Gone (1964) and Nevada Smith (1966). Carroll Baker who had appeared in The Carpetbaggers then starred in the Embassy's Harlow (1965).

Levine got to know Mike Nichols who was one of the most in-demand directors on Broadway and signed him to make The Graduate (1967) before he made his feature film debut with Who's Afraid of Virginia Woolf? (1966). It was the highest-grossing film of the year. Levine also hired first-time director Mel Brooks to make The Producers (1967). Levine later said "I have a knack for betting on unknown directors and actors and getting my money's worth". The same year, Levine sold Embassy to Avco for $40 million but stayed on as chief executive officer. He later called the sale a "horrible mistake which made me rich".

The Lion in Winter (1968), Levine's favorite of his films, won an Academy Award for Katharine Hepburn. After the sale, his films did not perform well except for Mike Nichols' Carnal Knowledge (1971) and A Touch of Class (1973), his last hit. He resigned from Avco Embassy in 1974 and formed Joseph E. Levine Presents and spent 2½ years making A Bridge Too Far (1977) with his son Richard. His last film was Tattoo (1981).

Broadway 
In April 1964, David Susskind, Daniel Melnick, and Levine took over as producers for the Broadway musical Kelly. Levine financed $250,000 of the $400,000 budget, with the balance coming from Columbia Records and six other investors. The producers also acquired the motion picture rights.

Directed and choreographed by Herbert Ross, the musical began previews at the Broadhurst Theatre on February 1, 1965, and opened (and closed) on February 6 after seven previews and one performance, becoming one of the biggest flops in Broadway history.

Industry representatives quoted in The New York Times stated they "could not recall any other Broadway musical representing such a comparable expenditure that became a casualty so quickly." Costs had ballooned to $650,000, with the biggest loser being Levine, followed by Melnick and Susskind, who had invested a total of $150,000. There had been increasing arguments between the producers and writers, with Susskind complaining that the authors were unwilling to make changes per the recommendations of the investors. Charlap and Lawrence were so upset with changes that they filed suit in New York Supreme Court seeking an injunction to prevent the play from opening.  While the judge urged that the parties pursue arbitration, lawyers representing Charlap and Lawrence were threatening to sue for damages that had been caused through "unauthorized changes, omissions and additions" made to the musical.

Trademarks 
Levine became famous in the industry for his massive advertising campaigns, starting with Hercules in 1959. Levine had hired Terry Turner, who had been a former RKO Pictures exploitation expert of the late 1920s and 1930s, where he had exploited King Kong amongst other films. Levine's and Turner's exploitation campaigns were designed to appeal both to the general public and to the film industry and exhibitors. The Adventurers (1970) had a special "airborne world premiere", as the in-flight movie of a TWA Boeing 747 Superjet making its premiere voyage, flying from New York to Los Angeles, with the film's stars and members of the press aboard. It marked the first time that a movie and a plane premiered in the same event.

Honors 
In 1964, Levine received the Golden Globe Cecil B. DeMille Award in recognition of his lifetime achievement in motion pictures.

Death 
Levine was hospitalized on June 21, 1987, and died the following month on July 31 in Greenwich, Connecticut, at the age of 81. His known survivors, in addition to his widow Rosalie, included his son Richard, his daughter Tricia, and two grandchildren.

Filmography

Producer credits 

 Gaslight Follies (documentary) (1945)
 Morgan, the Pirate (1961)
 The Wonders of Aladdin (1961)
 The Empty Canvas (1963)
 Contempt (1963)
 The Carpetbaggers (1964)
 Only One New York (documentary) (1964)
 Where Love Has Gone (1964)
 Harlow (1965)
 The Spy with a Cold Nose (1966)
 They Call Me Trinity (1970)
 A Bridge Too Far (1977)
 Magic (1978)
 Tattoo (1981)

Executive producer credits 

 The Second Best Secret Agent in the Whole Wide World (1965): Levine renamed this film Licensed to Kill for its American release and added a title song performed by Sammy Davis, Jr.
 Darling (uncredited) (1965)
 Sands of the Kalahari (1965)
 Where the Bullets Fly (1966)
 The Oscar (1966)
 The Daydreamer (1966)
 Nevada Smith (1966)
 A Man Called Adam (1966)
 The Idol (1966)
 The Caper of the Golden Bulls (1967)
 Woman Times Seven (1967)
 The Tiger and the Pussycat (1967)
 Robbery (1967)
 Sands of the Kalahari (1967)
 The Graduate (1967)
 The Producers (1967)
 The Lion in Winter (1968)
 Mad Monster Party? (1969)
 Don't Drink the Water (1969)
 Sunflower (1970)
 The Adventurers (1970)
 Soldier Blue (1970)
 Macho Callahan (1970)
 C.C. and Company (1970)
 Carnal Knowledge (1971)
 Trinity Is Still My Name (1971)
 Rivals (1972)
 Thumb Tripping (1972)
 The Day of the Dolphin (1973)

Joseph E. Levine presents 

 Attila: Scourge of God (1954): US release 1958 (retitled, Attila) "Joseph E. Levine presents" (first solo presenter's credit)
 Walk Into Paradise (1956): Levine retitled film, Walk into Hell, for 1957 US release. "Joseph E. Levine in association with Terry Turner presents"
 Godzilla, King of the Monsters! (1956) "A Trans-World Release" (Levine's uncredited Embassy Pictures distributed in eastern US only)
 The Fabulous World of Jules Verne (1957)
 Uncle Was a Vampire (1959)
 Jack the Ripper (1959): (Levine provided a new soundtrack, with music composed by Pete Rugolo, and added color to a sequence of blood in the B&W film.)
 Morgan, the Pirate (1960)
 Two Women (uncredited) (1960)
 The Thief of Baghdad (1961)
 The Wonders of Aladdin (1961)
 Long Day's Journey into Night (1962)
 Strangers in the City (1962)
 Boys' Night Out (1962)
 Constantine and the Cross (1962)
 The Last Days of Sodom and Gomorrah (1962)
 Zulu (1964)
 Santa Claus Conquers the Martians (1964) (This film marked the screen debut of Pia Zadora as one of the children.)
 Marriage Italian-Style (uncredited) (1964)
 Dingaka (1965)

Quotes 
"You can fool all of the people if the advertising is right."

Popular culture 
 He was the subject of 1963 documentary Showman by Albert and David Maysles.
 In an issue of the Fantastic Four (#48), The Thing mentions, upon seeing the sky aflame, that it could be just Joseph E. Levine advertising one of his movies.

References 

 

1905 births
1987 deaths
Film producers from Massachusetts
Cecil B. DeMille Award Golden Globe winners
Businesspeople from Boston
American people of Russian-Jewish descent
20th-century American businesspeople